Charles III acceded to the throne of the United Kingdom and the thrones of the other Commonwealth realms upon the death of his mother, Elizabeth II, on the afternoon of 8 September 2022. Royal succession in the realms occurs immediately upon the death of the reigning monarch. The formal proclamation in Britain occurred on 10 September 2022, at 10:00 BST, the same day on which the Accession Council gathered at St James's Palace in London. The other realms, including most Canadian provinces and all Australian states, issued their own proclamations at times relative to their time zones, following meetings of the relevant privy or executive councils. While the line of succession is identical in all the Commonwealth realms, the royal title as proclaimed is not the same in all of them.

United Kingdom

The proclamation occurred on 10 September 2022 at 10:00am BST at St James's Palace in London. Even though all 700 members of the Privy Council were eligible to attend, only 200 were summoned due to limitations of space.

Before the King's arrival, the Clerk of the Council read the Accession Proclamation, which formally introduced the King's new regnal name: Charles III. The proclamation was signed by the Queen Consort, the Prince of Wales, the Archbishop of Canterbury, the Lord Chancellor, the Archbishop of York, the Earl Marshal, the Lord President of the Council and the Prime Minister. The Lord President then delivered remarks on issues dealing with the public proclamations and gun salutes at Hyde Park and the Tower of London. The King joined the second part of the council, attended only by Privy Counsellors, and delivered a personal address regarding the Queen's death. He took an oath to preserve the independence of the Church of Scotland, which was reaffirmed by signing two documents as the Queen Consort and the Prince of Wales witnessed his signature. At the conclusion of the ceremony, Privy Counsellors signed the proclamation. A minor incident during the signing, in which the King showed visible frustration at there being too many items on his under-sized table, went viral online.

Charles III's Accession Council was the first to be televised and the first to be streamed online. At 11:00, 21-gun salutes at the Tower of London, Cardiff Castle, Edinburgh Castle, Castle Cornet in Guernsey, Gibraltar, and naval bases and stations at sea marked the accession of Charles III. After the proclamation ceremony, the King greeted crowds outside Buckingham Palace.

When the Parliament of the United Kingdom met, members swore allegiance to the new king and expressed condolences for the late Queen's death. Most parliamentary activities were suspended for 10 days. At 15:30, the king hosted the prime minister and the cabinet for an audience. On the same day, the proclamation of the accession was issued by the devolved governments of Scotland, Wales and Northern Ireland.

Text of proclamation
The following text, which was published as a supplement to The London Gazette of 12 September, was read by the Clerk of the Accession Council, Richard Tilbrook:

The proclamation was read by the Garter King of Arms, David White, at 11:00am from the Proclamation Gallery of Friary Court in St James's Palace, then by the Clarenceux King of Arms, Timothy Duke, at the Royal Exchange in the City of London.  Flags flew at full-mast at 11:00am on  Saturday as the proclamation was being read, before being returned to half-mast until the day of the Queen's funeral. Several services were held across the UK on the same day and the day after during which the proclamation was read by local officials. 

As was the case in past proclamations, before the traditional three cheers the proclamation ceremony in the areas around the Tower of London had the following response by personnel of the Yeomen Warders following the proclamation being read by the Resident Governor of the Tower of London and Keeper of the Jewel House, in a preview of the cheers to the Sovereign being shouted from this point on in the traditional Ceremony of the Keys in the Tower:

Chief Warder: "God preserve King Charles III!"
Warders: "Amen!"

Wales

The proclamation in Wales was held at the Cardiff Castle in Cardiff on 10 September with more than 2,000 people attending the ceremony. Guests included Members of the Senedd, Secretary of State for Wales Robert Buckland and other officials. The ceremony was officiated by First Minister Mark Drakeford who first had the Wales Herald Thomas Lloyd read the proclamation in English, and then had the Lord Lieutenant of South Glamorgan Morfudd Meredith read it in Welsh.

The proclamation in Welsh reads:

Northern Ireland

The proclamation in Northern Ireland was held at the Hillsborough Castle in Royal Hillsborough on 11 September at 12:00 BST. It was read out by Robert Noel, Norroy and Ulster King of Arms. Attendees included Secretary of State for Northern Ireland Chris Heaton-Harris, Minister of State for Northern Ireland Steve Baker, Democratic Unionist Party leader Jeffrey Donaldson and Alliance party leader Naomi Long. While Sinn Féin stayed away and attended a rally in Belfast for victims of The Troubles instead, the party said it would attend other official events during the period of mourning.

Scotland

The proclamation in Scotland was held at Mercat Cross, Edinburgh on 11 September. The ceremony was attended by Scottish judges and politicians, including First Minister Nicola Sturgeon. It was read out by Joseph Morrow, Lord Lyon King of Arms. A few attendees protested against the monarchy and booed as Morrow spoke.

On 12 September, the proclamation was read out at Comhairle nan Eilean Siar in Stornoway, both in English and Scottish Gaelic.

The proclamation in Scottish Gaelic reads:

British Overseas Territories
The Form of Proclamation for British Overseas Territories was set out in an Order in Council approved at the Accession Council.

Anguilla

The proclamation in Anguilla was held at the Government House in Old Ta at 11:00 a.m. on 11 September and was read out by Governor Dileeni Daniel-Selvaratnam.

Bermuda
The proclamation in Bermuda took place in Front Street, Hamilton on 11 September and was read out by Governor of Bermuda, Rena Lalgie, in the presence of legislators and a crowd of Bermudians. The ceremony was accompanied by a march-past by the Royal Bermuda Regiment and a 21-gun salute over Hamilton Harbour to mark the closing of the proclamation shortly after 9 am local time.

British Antarctic Territory

The proclamation in the British Antarctic Territory, the largest and most southerly of the British overseas territories,  was read out by Commissioner Paul Candler via a video link from London on 12 September to Rothera Research Station.

British Virgin Islands
The proclamation in the British Virgin Islands took place at the Government House in Road Town on 11 September and was read out by Governor John Rankin, in the presence of Premier Natalio Wheatley, Deputy Governor David Archer Jr., and members of the House of the Assembly. After the proclamation, those in attendance said God Save the King, followed by a gun salute.

Cayman Islands
The proclamation in the Cayman Islands took place at the Government House in Grand Cayman, on 11 September at 9:00 AM (local time), by Governor Martyn Roper. This was accompanied by a 21-gun salute and a march past by contingents of the Royal Cayman Islands Police Service, Cayman Islands Regiment, Cayman Islands Coast Guard, Cayman Islands Fire Service, Cayman Islands Prison Service, Cayman Islands Cadet Corps and its marching band.

Falkland Islands

The proclamation in Falkland Islands was held at the Government House in Stanley on the morning of 11 September, and was read by Governor Alison Blake. The ceremony was attended by government officials, members of the Legislative Assembly and representatives of British Forces South Atlantic Islands.

Gibraltar

The proclamation in Gibraltar took place at The Convent at midday on 11 September. It was read out by Governor David Steel, who was joined by the political, civic and religious leaders of the territory. A 21-gun salute was fired after the ceremony by the Royal Gibraltar Regiment from Devil's Gap Battery.

Montserrat

The proclamation in Montserrat took place at Salem Park at 7:55 a.m. (local time) on 11 September and was read out by Governor Sarah Tucker. It was followed by a rendition of God Save the King, a 21-gun salute and three cheers for King Charles III.

Pitcairn Islands

The proclamation in Pitcairn Islands, one of the smallest British overseas territories, took place at the town hall in Adamstown on 11 September. It was read out by Governor Iona Thomas via a video link from Wellington, New Zealand.

Saint Helena, Ascension and Tristan da Cunha

The proclamation in Saint Helena, Ascension and Tristan da Cunha took place at the Saint Helena Supreme Court in Jamestown at 10:30 a.m. on 11 September. It was read out by Governor Nigel Phillips.

South Georgia and the South Sandwich Islands

The proclamation in South Georgia and the South Sandwich Islands was read out by Commissioner Alison Blake via a video link from the Government House in Stanley, Falkland Islands on 11 September to overwintering teams at King Edward Point and Bird Island.

Sovereign Base Areas of Akrotiri and Dhekelia

The proclamation in Sovereign Base Areas of Akrotiri and Dhekelia took place at the Episkopi Cantonment on 11 September and was read out by the Administrator Peter J. M. Squires.

Turks and Caicos Islands

The proclamation in the Turks and Caicos Islands was held at Waterloo in Grand Turk Island on 11 September at 11:00 a.m and was read out by Governor Nigel Dakin.

Crown Dependencies

Bailiwick of Guernsey

The proclamation in the Bailiwick of Guernsey was held in Guernsey, Alderney, and Sark at 12 p.m. BST on 11 September.

In Guernsey, a special sitting of the States of Guernsey was held at 11 a.m. BST when the Bailiff of Guernsey Richard McMahon read out the proclamation. The ceremony was attended by Lieutenant Governor Richard Cripwell, members of the clergy and government officials. A procession from St James to the Crown Pier by the Corps of Drums of Elizabeth College then took place. After a fanfare trumpet, the Sheriff of Guernsey Jason Savident publicly read out the proclamation. This was followed by the attendees shouting "Dieu Sauve Le Roi" and a 21-gun salute from Castle Cornet. Cripwell then led the three cheers for Charles III.

In Alderney, the proclamation was read out by William Tate, the President of the States of Alderney, at the Court House. This was followed by a public proclamation at the Island Hall. In Sark, a sitting of the Chief Pleas was held before the proclamation was read out by Kevin Adams, the Prévôt of Sark, outside St Peter's Church.

Isle of Man
On 11 September, Lieutenant Governor John Lorimer proclaimed Charles III as the Lord of Mann during a ceremony at Government House in Onchan at 12:00 BST. A second ceremony took place on 16 September on Tynwald Hill in St John's, where the accession of Charles III was also proclaimed in the Manx language by Lorimer. Both the ceremonies were attended by Chief Minister Alfred Cannan and the President of Tynwald Laurence Skelly.

The proclamation in English reads:

Jersey

The proclamation in Jersey was held at the Royal Square on 11 September. The States Assembly first received the proclamation at 12:00 BST, after which the Bailiff of Jersey Timothy Le Cocq mourned the death of Queen Elizabeth II and it approved 19 September, the day of her funeral, as a bank holiday. Le Cocq then delivered a speech in the Royal Square at 12:30 before reading out the proclamation. The ceremony was attended by Members of the States Assembly, officials of the Royal Court and other government departments, as well as veterans. A 21-gun salute took place at Glacis Field following the ceremony.

Canada

The proclamation in Canada took place at Rideau Hall in Ottawa on 10 September following a formal meeting of the King's Privy Council for Canada. Prime Minister Justin Trudeau and Governor General Mary Simon then signed the proclamation. It was followed by a ceremony that included herald trumpets, a 21-gun salute by the Royal Canadian Artillery and a moment of remembrance for Queen Elizabeth II. The artillery was accidentally fired before the French version of the proclamation had been read out.

Text of proclamation
The proclamation was read out by Samy Khalid, the Chief Herald of Canada, in English:

Khalid then proceeded immediately to read the proclamation in French:

Provincial proclamations
In addition to the ceremony in Ottawa, proclamations of accession ceremonies were also held by several provincial lieutenant governors. The lieutenant governors of New Brunswick, Newfoundland, Nova Scotia, and Saskatchewan issued their proclamations on 10 September at their  Government Houses. The lieutenant governors of Ontario and Prince Edward Island issued their proclamations on 12 September, the former at the Ontario Legislative Building, the latter at Government House, Charlottetown. The lieutenant governor of Manitoba issued the proclamation on 14 September 2022. The lieutenant governor of Alberta issued the proclamation on 15 September 2022.

New Brunswick

The proclamation in New Brunswick was held at Government House in Fredricton on 10 September. The ceremony began with a traditional blessing by Wolastoqi Elder Imelda Perley, a prayer by Anglican Bishop of Fredricton David Edwards and remarks by Premier Blaine Higgs. Lieutenant Governor Brenda Murphy then read out the proclamation, which was followed by singing of God Save the King and a 21-gun salute.

In English:

In French:

Newfoundland and Labrador

The proclamation in Newfoundland and Labrador was held at the Government House in St. John's on 10 September and was read out by Lieutenant Governor Judy Foote. The ceremony was officiated by Premier Andrew Furey. It was followed by a 21-gun salute, a rendition of God Save the King and a toast to Charles III.

Nova Scotia

The proclamation in Nova Scotia was held at the Government House in Halifax on 10 September and read out by Lieutenant Governor Arthur LeBlanc. The ceremony was attended by Premier Tim Houston, Justice Minister Brad Johns as well as other officials, and included a 21-gun salute.

Saskatchewan

A proclamation ceremony was held by the government of Saskatchewan on 10 September at the Government House in Regina. Premier Scott Moe formally advised Lieutenant Governor Russell Mirasty to issue the proclamation. Moe and Mirasty then signed the proclamation, and Mirasty read it out to the assembled group.

Quebec
No formal proclamation ceremony was held in the province of Quebec. However on 10 September Lieutenant Governor Michel Doyon and his wife Pauline Théberge issued a press release marking the accession of Charles as King and Camilla as Queen Consort.

In English:

In French:

Ontario
A proclamation ceremony was held by the government of Ontario on 12 September at the Ontario Legislative Building in Toronto. Premier Doug Ford formally advised Lieutenant Governor Elizabeth Dowdeswell to issue the proclamation. Dowdeswell then signed and read out the proclamation.

In English:

In French:

Prince Edward Island

The proclamation in Prince Edward Island was held at the Government House in Charlottetown on 12 September. The ceremony was presided over by Lieutenant Governor Antoinette Perry who signed and read the proclamation. It was attended by Premier Dennis King and other officials. A 21-gun salute took place after the ceremony.

Manitoba
The proclamation in Manitoba was held in Winnipeg on 14 September. It was signed by Lieutenant Governor Janice Filmon and Minister of Justice and Attorney General Kelvin Goertzen.

In English:

In French:

Alberta
The proclamation in Alberta was held at the Government House in Edmonton on 15 September and was read out by Lieutenant Governor Salma Lakhani. It was signed by Lakhani, Premier Jason Kenney and Justice Minister Tyler Shandro. The ceremony ended with a rendition of God Save the King.

Australia

The proclamation in Australia took place in front of the Parliament House, Canberra, on 11 September and was read out by Governor-General David Hurley, after being approved by an Australian Executive Council meeting at the Government House. The proclamation was signed by Hurley and countersigned by Prime Minister Anthony Albanese. An Indigenous Australian dance ceremony followed the proclamation along with a 21-gun salute. Similar proclamations took place on the same day in all the states of Australia, except Victoria, which issued its proclamation, on Monday, 12 September, this reflecting each state's separate relationship to the crown.

Text of proclamation 
The proclamation was read by Governor-General David Hurley at Parliament House.

State proclamations

New South Wales
The proclamation ceremony in New South Wales took place on the steps of the New South Wales Parliament House, Sydney on 11 September and was read out by Governor Margaret Beazley. The ceremony followed by a 21-gun salute from the grounds of the Government House. Public transport was made free for the day for the ceremony. The New South Wales Police Force estimated that approximately 5,000 had attended the ceremony.

The proclamation occurred after a meeting of the New South Wales Executive Council earlier that day, which was presided by the state Governor Margaret Beazley at the Government House. In the meeting, state premier Dominic Perrottet and other state ministers recommended that the Governor proclaim Charles III as King of Australia, which the Governor accepted.

Queensland

The proclamation in Queensland was held first at the Government House, and later at the Parliament House in Brisbane on 11 September. It was read out by Governor Jeannette Young. Premier Annastacia Palaszczuk attended both of the ceremonies and delivered a tribute to Queen Elizabeth II. An estimated 2,300 Queenslanders attended the ceremony at the Government House according to the state government.

South Australia

The proclamation in South Australia took place outside the South Australian Parliament House in Adelaide on 11 September and was read by Governor Frances Adamson. The ceremony was attended by Premier Peter Malinauskas, Speaker of the House of Assembly Dan Cregan, President of the Legislative Council Terry Stephens, and other officials. An estimated 8,000 South Australians gathered to witness it.

Tasmania

The proclamation in Tasmania took place at Government House in Hobart on 11 September. The text was read out and signed by Governor Barbara Baker and Premier Jeremy Rockliff. Anglican Bishop of Tasmania Richard Condie later read the Collect for the Monarch from the 1662 Book of Common Prayer.

Victoria

The proclamation in Victoria took place at the Government House in Melbourne on 12 September and was read out by Governor Linda Dessau, who re-swore Lieutenant-Governor James Angus and acting Supreme Court chief justice Karin Emerton to their posts under a constitutional requirement. The ceremony was also attended by Premier Daniel Andrews and Opposition Leader Matthew Guy.

The proclamation was jointly signed by Dassau, Andrews, Emerton, Legislative Assembly speaker Maree Edwards and the President of the Legislative Council Nazih Elasmar.

On 13 September, Edwards read out the proclamation in the Parliament of Victoria, following which all Legislative Assembly MPs were asked to swear their allegiance to King Charles. Samantha Ratnam, the leader of the Victorian Greens party, criticised this policy as absurd.

Western Australia

The proclamation in Western Australia took place at the Government House in Perth on 11 September and was read out by Governor Chris Dawson. It was signed by Premier Mark McGowan and Dawson.

New Zealand

The proclamation in New Zealand took place on the steps of the Parliament Buildings, Wellington, at 12:30 p.m. NZST on 11 September. After the national anthem God Defend New Zealand was sung by LAC Barbara Graham both in the Māori language and English, parliamentary kaumātua Kura Moeahu offered a karakia.

The proclamation was read out first in English and then in Māori following speeches by Prime Minister Jacinda Ardern and Governor-General Cindy Kiro. The ceremony concluded with a 21-gun salute fired from Point Jerningham in Wellington by the 16th Field Regiment. A second 21-gun salute was fired from the Devonport Naval Base in Auckland at the same time.

Text of proclamation

The proclamation was read out in English by the New Zealand Herald of Arms Extraordinary Phillip O'Shea:

It was then read in Māori by Kura Moeahu:

Jamaica
On 10 September, a 21-gun salute conducted by the Jamaica Defence Force at its headquarters of Up-Park Camp in recognition of the British proclamation.

The proclamation ceremony for Jamaica took place at the King's House in Kingston on 13 September and the proclamation was read out by Governor-General Patrick Allen.

Text of proclamation

Antigua and Barbuda

The proclamation in Antigua and Barbuda took place at the Government House in St. John's on 10 September. The document of the proclamation was signed by Prime Minister Gaston Browne, who later stated that the country might hold a referendum on the monarchy within the next three years.

The Bahamas
The proclamation in the Bahamas took place at the Parliament Square in Nassau, on 11 September. It was signed by Governor-General Cornelius A. Smith. The ceremony was attended by Prime Minister Philip Davis, members of the judiciary, diplomatic corps, Senators, MPs, and other officials. It was accompanied by a fanfare trumpet and a 21-gun salute by the Royal Bahamas Defence Force.

Text of proclamation

The proclamation was read out by Hubert Ingraham, the former Prime Minister of the Bahamas.

Grenada 
The proclamation in Grenada took place at the Government House in St. George's on 12 September and was read out by Governor-General Cécile La Grenade. It was signed by La Grenade and Prime Minister Dickon Mitchell.

Solomon Islands

Charles was officially declared as the King of Solomon Islands on 12 September after Governor-General David Vunagi read out the proclamation issued by the Accession Council in Honiara.

Papua New Guinea
The proclamation in Papua New Guinea took place at National Parliament House in Port Moresby, on 13 September and was officiated by Governor-General Bob Dadae. The ceremony was attended by Prime Minister James Marape, Deputy Prime Minister John Rosso, Speaker of the National Parliament Job Pomat and other officials. It also included a 96-gun salute and a moment of silence in honour of the Queen.

Text of proclamation

Governor-General Bob Dadae read out the proclamation at the ceremony.

Saint Vincent and the Grenadines 
Saint Vincent and the Grenadines issued the proclamation in relation to King Charles III under the hand of the deputy of the Governor-General Susan Dougan.

See also 
 Proclamation of accession of Elizabeth II (1952)
 Coronation of Charles III and Camilla

References

External links
Accession Council and Principal Proclamation – The Royal Family (via YouTube)
Accession Council and Principal Proclamation – The Royal Household
In full: King Charles III's Accession ceremony – Sky News (via YouTube)
Text of the Canadian proclamation as published in the Canada Gazette
Text of proclamations in provinces of Canada:
Alberta
Manitoba
New Brunswick
Newfoundland and Labrador
Nova Scotia
Ontario
Prince Edward Island
Saskatchewan

Text of proclamations in Australia:
Commonwealth
New South Wales
Queensland
South Australia
Tasmania
Victoria
Western Australia

Charles III
Death and state funeral of Elizabeth II
House of Windsor
British monarchy
Monarchy in Canada
Monarchy in Australia
Monarchy in New Zealand
Proclamations
September 2022 events
September 2022 events in the United Kingdom
2022 in Canada
2022 in Australia
2022 in New Zealand
Articles containing video clips